The Dangerous Rescue by Jude Watson is the thirteenth in a series of young reader novels called Jedi Apprentice. The series explores the adventures of Qui-Gon Jinn and Obi-Wan Kenobi prior to Star Wars: Episode I – The Phantom Menace.

Plot
Obi-Wan Kenobi is joined by Jedi Master Adi Gallia and her Padawan Siri Tachi at Jenna Zan Arbor's secret laboratory on Simpla-12. Zan Arbor, who has been conducting experiments in an attempt to break the Force into its constituent parts, is holding captive Qui-Gon Jinn and the elderly Jedi Master Noor R'aya. The three rescuers attempt to smuggle themselves into the laboratory; however, despite the fact that Qui-Gon has managed to free himself, Zan Arbor escapes with the unconscious Noor.

Later, Obi-Wan receives a message informing him that his companion Astri Oddo, who went to pursue the bounty hunter Ona Nobis, is injured on the planet of Sorrus. Qui-Gon and Adi send their Padawans to Sorrus to bring Astri home, but Obi-Wan learns that this was merely a trap set by Ona Nobis, and wisely chooses to run away from a fight. He and Siri are ordered to return to the Jedi Temple, but he convinces Siri that they should look for Astri since she's on Sorrus. They are transported to the far desert and investigate a cave where they find Astri and her three companions tied up. However, the cave collapses — another trap set by Ona Nobis. The party are eventually rescued by a member of a tribe that Astri once helped. The two Padawans learn that Ona Nobis is headed to Belasco, the homeworld of Senator Uta S'orn, Jenna Zan Arbor's only friend.

On Belasco, the Jedi discover that the population is suffering unusually severely from bacteria that recur in the drinking supply every seven years. They find Senator S'orn caring for sick children, but she wants nothing to do with the Jedi. Eventually, they discover that S'orn has altered Galactic Senate transcripts for Zan Arbor, and that Zan Arbor is likely on the planet. Suspecting that Zan Arbor has bioengineered the bacteria in order to make a profit selling a cure, the four Jedi infiltrate the water purification plant, obtaining dated water samples as evidence.

Obi-Wan and Siri then follow Uta S'orn as she delivers dinner to patients at the royal grounds, in the hope that she will lead them to the hiding place of Zan Arbor and Ona Nobis. After seeing Ona Nobis eat dinner, they report back to their Masters, who confront the Leader of Belasco and ask that S'orn's quarters be searched. There, the Jedi find Jenna Zan Arbor, along with the captive Noor R'aya. Zan Arbor is quickly captured, but Obi-Wan notices that Siri has left the room, and he goes to search for her. He finds her cornered by Ona Nobis on the palace roof, and the two Padawans manage to hold off the wily bounty hunter. Ona Nobis then tries to escape, but she falls to her death when Siri slashes through her whip.

External links

Amazon.com Listing
CargoBay Listing
TheForce.net review

2001 American novels
2001 science fiction novels
Star Wars: Jedi Apprentice
Star Wars Legends novels
American science fiction novels
American young adult novels